Oreolalax schmidti (Schmidt's lazy toad or webless toothed toad) is a species of amphibian in the family Megophryidae. It is endemic to China where it can be found in the Hengduan Mountains in western Sichuan and northern Yunnan provinces. Its natural habitats are temperate forests, subtropical moist shrubland, rivers, swamps, and freshwater marshes. It is threatened by habitat loss. It is named after Karl Patterson Schmidt, American herpetologist.

References

schmidti
Amphibians of China
Endemic fauna of China
Taxonomy articles created by Polbot
Amphibians described in 1947